The Sanghol Museum is an archaeological museum in Sanghol, Punjab, India. The existing building of the Museum was inaugurated on April 10, 1990 as a subordinate unit of the Department of Cultural Affairs, Archaeology and Museums of the Punjab Government.

Gallery

References

Museums in Punjab, India
Archaeological museums in India